Fiji competed at the 1983 World Championships in Athletics in Helsinki, Finland, from August 7 to 14, 1983.

Men 
Track and road events

Women 
Field events

References

Nations at the 1983 World Championships in Athletics
World Championships in Athletics
1983